Captain Robert Fyssher led the local Isle of Wight militia to victory against French forces in the Battle of Bonchurch, in July 1545.

References

English army officers
Year of birth missing
Year of death missing
Place of birth missing